Khed (Pronunciation: [kʰeːɖ]) is a municipal council in the Ratnagiri district of the state of Maharashtra, India. Khed town is situated on the Mumbai - Ratnagiri Highway. 

Khed is the headquarters of Khed taluka which connects the district administration with the village administration.

Geography 
It has an average elevation of 25 metres (82 feet). Alphonso mangoes are grown in the area around the town. Khed lies between Kashedi Ghat and Bhoste Ghat. The region surrounding the town is mostly mountainous.

The Jagbudi River is a large river located in the area. Raghuveer ghat is mainly use for picnic spots.

Culture 

Khed is a town that has many festivities. Several religious festivals are celebrated in the town. Social groups like Navnirman Kala Sanstha have been promoting artists from surrounding villages to show their work at state and national levels since 2004.

'RAJ YUVA Mahostav' & 'JCI festival' (mela) is also organized in Khed once every year.

Shimaga (Holi) and Ganapati are Konkan's favorite festivals. Gauri-Ganpati festival is celebrated with cheer and enthusiasm all over the taluka.

Ram Navmi festival is celebrated in Laxmi Narayan Temple. It is celebrated for 10 days starting from Gudi Padva. 
 
Ganesh utsav is largely and joyfully celebrated in the city.
 
One of the most important attractions of Khed is the annual rally conducted on the occasion of Shiv Jayanti.

Vade-Mutton is a popular dish in the khed. The staple diet is rice and fish. Ghavane is one of the main dishes in the menu which prepared by the rice flour, eaten as Breakfast. Also, Monga is a famous food item called as "Popati" in north Konkan.

taivarshik jatra festival is celebrated in {zolai kedar nath Templein hedali} . It is celebrated for 4 days starting from
 {akhand harinam saptah} festival is celebrated in {vithal rakhumai Templein hedali bajarwadi} It is celebrated for 7 days starting from

Demographics 
The 2001 Indian census reported that Khed had a population of 13,813. Males constituted 49% of the population and females 51%. Khed had an average literacy rate of 97%, which was higher than the national average of 69.5%. The literacy rate among males was 98%, and among females, it was 96%.

In the 2011 Indian census, the town of Khed [listed] 15,249 inhabitants.

Industry 
Several factories [that produce] chemicals and pharmaceuticals are located in Khed.  Furthermore, the Maharashtra Industrial Development Corporation (MIDC) has developed the Lote-Parshuram industrial area in Khed.

Transport 

Khed lies off National Highway NH-66, popularly known as Mumbai-Goa Highway, which connects Khed with cities like Mangalore, Panaji, Madgaon, Karwar and Udupi. The Bharna Naka – Khed road, part of state highway SH-106, connects NH-66 to the town of Khed. Khed has a railway station on the Konkan Railway line and a Maharashtra State Road Transport Corporation (MSRTC) bus station connecting Khed taluka to major cities in Maharashtra.

Khed railway station connects three talukas (Dapoli, Mandangad, and Khed) to the railway map of India.

Education
Khed has many English, Urdu, and Marathi medium schools and colleges:
 M.I.B Girl's High School And Junior College.
 Sriman Chandulal Sheth High School & Jr.College.
 Navabharat High School & Junior College, Bharne.
 L. P. English School.
 Haji SM Mukaddam High school and Junior College.
 L. T. T. English Medium School & Junior College.
 M. I. Hajwani English Medium School & Junior College.
 Rotary English Medium School,DELHI AFFILIATED{CBSE} 
 Shiv Shankar Madhyamik Vidyalaya & Jr. College, Kulwandi.

 Dnyandeep Vidya Mandir, Bhadgaon.
 Vishwakarma Sahajeevan Institute of Management.
 New English Junior College of Aambavali.
 Yogita Dental College Khed.
 S.I.Junior college, furus, khed.
 New English school, Dayal, Khed.
 I.C.S College Khed.
 Ideal English school Furus.
 New English school,hedali saveni
 z.p.school hedali

See also 
Saitavde
Tisangi

References 

Talukas in Maharashtra
Cities and towns in Ratnagiri district

pt:Rajgurunagar (Khed)